In Greek mythology, Parthenope ( means "maiden-voiced") may refer to the following personages:

 Parthenope, mother of Europa and Thraike by Oceanus, Titan of the great world-encircling river. = FGrHist 10 F 7 (Fowler 2000, ; Fowler 2013, ; Bouzek and Graninger, . Fowler 2013, p. 15, calls Parthenope, "elsewhere variously a Siren, a daughter of Ankaios, and a paramour of Herakles" an ad hoc invention.) These daughters are sometimes counted among the Oceanids, thus their mother could be Tethys, the Titaness sister-consort of Oceanus.
 Parthenope, one of the Sirens.
 Parthenope, an Arcadian princess as daughter of King Stymphalus. She consorted with Heracles and had by him a son Everes.
 Parthenope, a Lelegian princess as daughter of King Ancaeus of Samos and Samia, daughter of Meander, one of the Potamoi. She consorted with Apollo and had a son Lycomedes.

Notes

References 

 Pausanias, Description of Greece with an English Translation by W.H.S. Jones, Litt.D., and H.A. Ormerod, M.A., in 4 Volumes. Cambridge, MA, Harvard University Press; London, William Heinemann Ltd. 1918. . Online version at the Perseus Digital Library
 Pausanias, Graeciae Descriptio. 3 vols. Leipzig, Teubner. 1903.  Greek text available at the Perseus Digital Library.
 Pseudo-Apollodorus, The Library with an English Translation by Sir James George Frazer, F.B.A., F.R.S. in 2 Volumes, Cambridge, MA, Harvard University Press; London, William Heinemann Ltd. 1921. . Online version at the Perseus Digital Library. Greek text available from the same website.
 Robert L. Fowler, Early Greek Mythography. Volume 2: Commentary. Oxford University Press. 2013.
 Strabo, The Geography of Strabo. Edition by H.L. Jones. Cambridge, Mass.: Harvard University Press; London: William Heinemann, Ltd. 1924. Online version at the Perseus Digital Library.
 Strabo, Geographica edited by A. Meineke. Leipzig: Teubner. 1877. Greek text available at the Perseus Digital Library.

Oceanids
Princesses in Greek mythology
Mortal parents of demigods in classical mythology
Women of Apollo
Arcadian characters in Greek mythology
Arcadian mythology